The Wrecking Crew is a 2000 American crime drama film directed by Albert Pyun and starring Snoop Dogg, Ice-T, and Ernie Hudson Jr.

Premise
A high-level government hit squad is sent into the streets in order to complete a deadly mission.

Cast
 Ice-T as "Menace"
 Ernie Hudson Jr. as Hakiem
 T. J. Storm as Josef
 David Askew as "Sly"
 Tarsha Nicole Jones as News Reporter (Miss Jones)
 Vincent Klyn as Juda
 Romany Malco as "Chewy"
 Rob Ladesich as Captain
 Snoop Dogg as "Dra-Man"
 Jahi J.J. Zuri as "Ceebo"

Production
The director, Albert Pyun shot the film simultaneously with two other "urban" features, Urban Menace and Corrupt, making sure his producers got the most out of their money as it was filmed in Eastern Europe on a shoestring budget.

See also 
 List of hood films

References

External links 
 
 
 
 The Wrecking Crew at the Disobiki.

2000 films
Hood films
Films directed by Albert Pyun
2000 crime drama films
American crime drama films
2000s English-language films
2000s American films